The men's 110 metres hurdles event at the 2021 European Athletics U23 Championships was held in Tallinn, Estonia, at Kadriorg Stadium on 9 and 10 July.

Records
Prior to the competition, the records were as follows:

Results

Round 1
Qualification rule: First 4 in each heat (Q) and the next 4 fastest (q) advance to the Semi-Finals.

Wind:Heat 1: +0.2 m/s, Heat 2: -1.0 m/s, Heat 3: -0.4 m/s, Heat 4: +0.6 m/s, Heat 5: 0.0 m/s

Semifinals
Qualification rule:  First 2 in each heat (Q) and the next 2 fastest (q) advance to the Final.

Wind:Heat 1: +0.1 m/s, Heat 2: -0.4 m/s, Heat 3: -1.3 m/s

Final

Wind: –1.6 m/s

References

110 metres hurdles
Sprint hurdles at the European Athletics U23 Championships